The sooty ant tanager (Habia gutturalis) is a species of bird in the cardinal family (Cardinalidae); formerly, it was placed with the true tanagers in the family Thraupidae.

It is endemic to Colombia. Its natural habitats are subtropical or tropical moist lowland forest and secondary forest. It is becoming rare due to habitat loss.

Taxonomy
The bird was first formally described in 1854 by the English zoologist Philip Sclater. The binomial name derives from the Guaraní name habia for various finches and tanagers, and the Latin word gutturalis which means "of the throat". The sooty ant tanager is a monotypic species.

Description

19-20 cm in length. The adult male is dark grey with a conspicuous scarlet crest (not always raised) and a rosy-red throat. The adult female is duller with a pinkish-white throat.

Distribution and Habitat

This bird is found in northwest Colombia, occurring in the Upper Sínu Valley at the northern end of the western Andes, and east along the north base of the Andes to the middle Magdalena River Valley.

Its natural habitat is humid tropical forests, edges, gaps and mature secondary forest. It prefers dense streamside and landslide habitats in extensive unbroken forest.

References

sooty ant tanager
Endemic birds of Colombia
sooty ant tanager
sooty ant tanager
Taxonomy articles created by Polbot